Sorey is an English surname. Notable people with the surname include:

Gladys Camille Sorey (born 1913), American singer and actress known professionally as Julie Gibson
Jim Sorey (1936–2008), American football player
Revie Sorey (born 1953), American football player
Tyshawn Sorey (born 1980), American musician

English-language surnames